Petacas is a lava dome in the departments of Cauca and Nariño, Colombia.

Doña Juana volcano lies nearby. Both volcanoes are located between the El Tablón Fault to the west and the San Jerónimo Fault to the east.

See also 
 List of volcanoes in Colombia
 List of volcanoes by elevation

References

Bibliography 
 

Mountains of Colombia
Volcanoes of Colombia
Pleistocene lava domes
Andean Volcanic Belt
Geography of Cauca Department
Geography of Nariño Department
Four-thousanders of the Andes